Mick Chatterton (born 26 March 1940) is a former Grand Prix motorcycle road racer. His best season was in 1969 when he finished the year in 16th place in the 250cc world championship. His last TT race was the 2004 lightweight 125.

References
Mick Chatterton career statistics at MotoGP.com
Brief biography of Mick Chatterton

1940 births
Living people
British motorcycle racers
250cc World Championship riders
350cc World Championship riders
Isle of Man TT riders
Place of birth missing (living people)